In mathematics, a hyperelliptic surface, or bi-elliptic surface, is a surface whose Albanese morphism is an elliptic fibration. Any such surface can be written as the quotient of a product of two elliptic curves by a finite abelian group.
Hyperelliptic surfaces form one of the classes of surfaces of Kodaira dimension 0 in the Enriques–Kodaira classification.

Invariants
The Kodaira dimension is 0.

Hodge diamond:

Classification
Any hyperelliptic surface is a quotient (E×F)/G, where E = C/Λ and F are elliptic curves, and G is a subgroup of F (acting on F by translations). There are seven families of hyperelliptic surfaces as in the following table. 

Here ω is a primitive cube root of 1 and i is a primitive 4th root of 1.

Quasi hyperelliptic surfaces

A quasi-hyperelliptic surface is a surface whose canonical divisor is numerically equivalent to zero, the Albanese mapping maps to an elliptic curve, and all its fibers are rational with a cusp. They only exist in characteristics 2 or 3. Their second Betti number is 2, the second Chern number vanishes, and the holomorphic Euler characteristic vanishes.
Any quasi-hyperelliptic surface is a quotient (E×F)/G, where E is a rational curve with one cusp, F is an elliptic curve, and G is a finite subgroup scheme of F (acting on F by translations).

References
 - the standard reference book for compact complex surfaces

Complex surfaces
Algebraic surfaces